Shirley Ross (born Bernice Maude Gaunt, January 7, 1913 – March 9, 1975) was an American actress and singer, notable for her duet with Bob Hope, "Thanks for the Memory" from The Big Broadcast of 1938.  She appeared in 25 feature films between 1933 and 1945, including singing earlier and wholly different lyrics for the Rodgers and Hart song in Manhattan Melodrama (1934) that later became "Blue Moon."

Early musical career
Ross was born in Omaha, Nebraska, the elder of two daughters of Charles Burr Gaunt and Maude C. (née Ellis) Gaunt. Growing up in California, she attended Hollywood High School and UCLA, training as a classical pianist.

By age 14, she was giving radio recitals and made her first vocal recordings at 20 with Gus Arnheims's band.

Here she attracted the notice of the up-and-coming songwriting duo Rodgers and Hart, who selected her to sell their latest offerings to MGM. One song, which was later re-written as "Blue Moon", led to a successful screen test in 1933 and then to a number of small parts in films that included Manhattan Melodrama with Clark Gable and William Powell in which, made up to look black, she sang "The Bad in Every Man," an earlier version of "Blue Moon," in a Harlem nightclub.

Paramount
In 1936, MGM loaned her to Paramount, and she was paired with Ray Milland in The Big Broadcast of 1937. Although this was officially a leading role, the Big Broadcast format included a busy programme of musical comedy sketches with big-name performers who somewhat overshadowed her. But one press review declared that she had ‘one of the sweetest voices of any actress on the screen’ and predicted a big future for her. Paramount signed her to a five-year contract; meanwhile her introduction to the songwriting team of Leo Robin and Ralph Rainger would prove significant.

Working with Bing Crosby and Bob Hope

Her duet with Bing Crosby in Waikiki Wedding was a Robin-Rainger number titled "Blue Hawaii." Thus began a three-year period during which Ross was cast opposite either Crosby or Bob Hope on five occasions.
After a career interruption in the making of This Way Please with Buddy Rogers, when she walked off the job, alleging that Jack Benny's wife, Mary Livingstone, was trying to sabotage her scenes, she was cast opposite Hope in The Big Broadcast of 1938. Their duet, "Thanks for the Memory", became a huge hit and a defining moment for two careers headed in opposite directions – for Hope, a springboard to bigger and better things; for Ross, the pinnacle.  It would prove to be her sole enduring claim to fame.

The duet's great success sparked spin-off movies with Bob Hope, Thanks for the Memory (1938) and another called Some Like It Hot (1939; later renamed Rhythm Romance to avoid confusion with the unrelated 1959 feature). Although Thanks for the Memory did produce another hit song, "Two Sleepy People", the films themselves made little impact, apparently reflecting Paramount's declining interest in musical comedy. Although Ross would have been willing to play straight drama and had performed well in Prison Wife, Paramount relegated her to supporting roles in two minor romantic comedies, which did nothing for her career, even though one of them (Paris Honeymoon) teamed her once more with Crosby. Her extremely promising career suffered a steep decline and never recovered.

Later career and death
Although Ross knew that her understated appeal was better suited to the screen than the stage, she played the lead in Rodgers and Hart’s Broadway musical Higher and Higher (1940), featuring the song "It Never Entered My Mind." The show was a critical failure. After a few forgettable movies and some radio work, most notably as a regular cast member on The Bob Burns Show between 1943 and 1947, Ross increasingly attended to her terminally ill husband Ken Dolan, which became an early retirement.

Ross died from cancer in Menlo Park, California, aged 62. As her married name, Bernice Dolan Blum, was not well known, her death was not widely publicized. But Hope, with whom she had an enduring real-life friendship, did not fail to commemorate her death. He and Crosby sent a 5-foot tall cross with white carnations and a spray of red roses to her funeral. According to her daughter, it was mobbed.

Filmography

 Bombshell (1933) - Singer (uncredited)
 Jail Birds of Paradise (1934, Short) - Shirley Ross
 Morocco Nights (1934, Short) - Singer
 Manhattan Melodrama (1934) - Singer in Cotton Club
 Hollywood Party (1934) - Singer of 'Feelin' High' (uncredited)
 What Price Jazz (1934, Short) - Singer
 The Girl from Missouri (1934) - Party Guest (uncredited)
 Gentlemen of Polish (1934, Short) - Singer
 The Merry Widow (1934) - Minor Role (uncredited)
 Buried Loot (1935, Short) - Girl in Apartment (uncredited)
 Two Hearts in Wax Time (1935, Short) - Shirley (uncredited)
 Age of Indiscretion (1935) - Dotty
 Calm Yourself (1935) - Mrs. Ruth Rockwell
 I Live My Life (1935) - Vi - drunken party guest dozing in armchair next to piano (uncredited)
 It's in the Air (1935) - Cigar Stand Clerk (uncredited)
 La Fiesta de Santa Barbara (1935, Short) - Herself
 Devil's Squadron (1936) - Eunice
 San Francisco (1936) - Trixie
 The Big Broadcast of 1937 (1936) - Gwen Holmes
 Hideaway Girl (1936) - Toni Ainsworth
 Waikiki Wedding (1937) - Georgia Smith
 Blossoms on Broadway (1937) - Sally Shea
 The Big Broadcast of 1938 (1938) - Cleo Fielding
 Prison Farm (1938) - Jean Forest
 Thanks for the Memory (1938) - Anne Merrick
 Dangerous to Know (1938) - Herself / Singer on Recording (voice, uncredited)
 Paris Honeymoon (1939) - Barbara Wayne aka Countess De Remi
 Cafe Society (1939) - Bells Browne
 Some Like It Hot (1939) - Lily Racquel
 Unexpected Father (1939) - Dianna Donovan
 Kisses for Breakfast (1941) - Juliet Marsden
 Sailors on Leave (1941) - Linda Hall
 A Song for Miss Julie (1945) - Valerie Kimbro (final film role)

Notes

References

External links

 
 Portrait of Shirley Ross seated on a desk, 1933. Los Angeles Times Photographic Archive (Collection 1429). UCLA Library Special Collections, Charles E. Young Research Library, University of California, Los Angeles.

Press Coverage
 United Press: "Co-Ed Crashes Gates of Hollywood Studio", The Pittsburgh Press, December 26, 1933, p. 18
 NEA (captioned photo): "The perfect legs of Shirley Ross...", The Spokane Chronicle (Monday, March 26, 1934), p. 5

 "Shirley Ross Wins Contract, Big Role", The Milwaukee Sentinel, September 8, 1936, p. 17
 "This Actress Proves Dangerous," The Pittsburgh Press (Tuesday, October 6, 1936), p. 27
 "New Star Tops State Musical," Spokane Daily Chronicle, October 12, 1936, p. 10
 Ed Sullivan: "Broadway: Building Up From a Terrific Letdown", The Pittsburgh Press,  October 24, 1936, p. 6
 "'Big Broadcast' Comes Thursday: Cast for Carolina Picture Includes Benny, Gracie Allen and Burns", The Spartanburg Herald-Tribune,  November 1, 1936, p. 20
 "'The Big Broadcast' Current Empire Film Has Mixture of Comedy and Music," The Lewiston Daily Sun, November 3, 1936, p. 2 
 Sheilah Graham: "Hollywood Today: 'Those Who Wait' Include Stars of Filmdom," The Milwaukee Journal, November 16, 1936, p. 7
 "Miss Ross Steals Show At Paramount", The Deseret News, January 26, 1937, p. 11
 Eileen Percy: "Shirley Ross to Play Lead in 'This Way Please'", The Milwaukee Sentinel, April 30, 1937, p. 2
 "Romance in 'Waikiki Wedding: Crosby's Latest at American Said to be Topnotch,'" The San Jose News, June 14, 1937, p. 13
 Louella O. Parsons: "Shirley Ross Has New Job", The Rochester Journal, June 29, 1937, p. 6
 "Theater Gossip: Runyon Story to be Filmed," The St. Petersburg Independent,  August 20, 1937, p. 5-A
 "Film Runyon's Story", The St. Petersburg Times, September 12, 1937, p. 22
 United Press: "Bing Crosby Shoots 73 to Defeat Hope", The Eugene Register-Guard, November 8, 1937, p. 6
 "Right This Way, My Charming Little Chickadees", The Pittsburgh Press, February 5, 1938, p. 10
 Associated Press wirephoto: "Finds 450 Dead," The Spokane Spokesman-Review, March 5, 1938, p. 13
 "'Big Broadcast of 1938' Stars", The Rochester (PA) Daily Times, March 31, 1938, p. 7
 "Shirley Ross Gets a Leading Role in 'Paris Honeymoon'", The Schenectady Gazette,  May 18, 1938, p. 8
 Jimmy Fidler: "Hollywood Shots: Bing's lost ad lib in 'Paris Honeymoon'," The Reading Eagle, June 22, 1938), p. 8
 Sheilah Graham: "Hollywood Clothes Offering Ideas to Brides, Travelers," The Milwaukee Journal, August 8, 1938, p. 2
 Ad for "Prison Farm", The Meriden Record, August 11, 1938, p. 13. "The man she loved put her in a prison more terrifying than Devil's Island."
 "Cutie Silences Glib Bob Hope With a Smart Crack," The Pittsburgh Press, September 18, 1938, p. D7
 Associated Press: "Pair Off in Hollywood: Genevieve Tobin and Shirley Ross Are Newlyweds", The Lawrence Journal-World, September 20, 1938, p. 12
 Louella O. Parsons: "It Was Ken Vs. Ken Until Shirley Chose Ken: Miss Ross and Dolan Reveal Marriage in Nevada," The Milwaukee Sentinel, September 20, 1938, p. 3
 "Bob Hope Stars as 'Househusband'," The Spokane Chronicle, January 3, 1939, p. 14
 "Song Inspires Film," The Melbourne Age, January 7, 1939, p. 12
 Kaspar Monahan: "Two Screen Comedies on Warner Bill: Bob Hope and Shirley Ross Shine in Adaptation of Stage Hit," The Pittsburgh Press, January 14, 1939, p. 6
 Patricia Lindsay: "Faddish Diets Are Out, Says Beauty Expert", The Miami News, June 30, 1939, p. 4-C
 L.S.B. Shapiro: "A New Hit for Broadway", The Montreal Gazette, April 13, 1940, p. 10
 Louella O. Parsons: "Film Actors Find New Careers on Broadway", Milwaukee Sentinel, April 14, 1940, p. 7-D 
 Associated Press: "Shirley Ross Sets Pace for Comediennes on Broadway," The Miami News, May 4, 1940, p. 6-A
 Jimmy Fidler: "Hollywood: Short Short Story," The Pittsburgh Press, August 19, 1940, p. 9
 Dee Lowrance: "Sister Sluggers: Ladies Of Hollywood Have Learned How To Flip A Mean Right and Are Glad to Oblige for the Camera", The Wilmington Star, June 29, 1941, p. 18
 Captioned photo (ad for Kisses for Breakfast): "They're Much Married", St. Petersburg Times, August 24, 1941, p. 21
 "Beautiful Star Collects Rent", The Madera Tribune, January 29, 1942, p. 1
 Associated Press: "Shirley Ross Granted Divorce From Dolan", The San Bernardino Sun, January 8, 1944, p. 2
 Dorothy Kilgallen: "Voice of Broadway: Gossip in Gotham", Pittsburgh Post-Gazette, January 24, 1944, p. 22
 Louella O. Parsons: "Hollywood: Snapshots of Hollywood Collected at Random", Milwaukee Sentinel, July 2, 1945, p. 6
 Rick Du Brow: "Original 'Thanks for the Memory' Girl Prefers Family to Stardom; Once Musical Comedy Star", The Beaver Valley Times, July 20, 1959, p. 9
 Polly Anderson: "How 'Thanks' became Hope's signature song", The Lumberton Robesonian, May 25, 2003, p. 4C

Miscellaneous
 
 Google Books – Roy Hemming on Shirley Ross (1991)
 Google Books – Bernard K. Dick on Ross, Crosby & Hope (2007)
 In My Mother's Kitchen: Life, Love, and Cooking with Shirley Ross
 Photographs and literature
 

1913 births
1975 deaths
Actresses from Omaha, Nebraska
American film actresses
American musical theatre actresses
American radio personalities
Deaths from cancer in California
Hollywood High School alumni
People from Menlo Park, California
Musicians from Omaha, Nebraska
People from Greater Los Angeles
University of California, Los Angeles alumni
20th-century American actresses
20th-century American singers
20th-century American women singers